Hutson II is the fifth solo album by Leroy Hutson. It was released November 1976 on Curtom Records. This album bookended Hutson's trilogy of classic albums he released between 1975 and 1977. It is considered to be one of his greatest albums.

Track listing 
All tracks composed by Leroy Hutson
"Love The Feeling" 3:53
"Situations" (Instrumental)  1:09
"I Do, I Do (Want To Make Love To You)" 3:57
"I Think I'm Falling In Love" 3:28
"Love To Hold You Close" 3:10
"Flying High" 3:49
"Blackberry Jam" 4:50
"Sofunkstication" 4:45
"Don't It Make You Feel Good" 3:04

Personnel 
Leroy Hutson - Lead Vocals, Clavinet, Keyboards, Ensemble, Strings, Synthesizer, Piano, Arrangements
Joel Brandon - Flute, Whistle
Fred Bredberg - Engineer
Mattie Butler, Brenda Ford, Denise Herd, Joe D. Reaves, Valerie Sams, Alfonso Surrett - Background Vocals
Reggie Gillerson, Benny "Porky" Scott - Bass Guitar
Stephen Harris, Phil Upchurch - Guitar
Aaron Jamal, Margie Stroud, James L. Hersen - keyboards
Tony Carpenter - Bongos
Cordell Carter, Donzell Davis, Donnell Hagan - Drums
Master Henry Gibson - Congas
Bill McFarland - Trombone
Michael Harris - Trumpet
Stephen Harris, Rich Tufo - Composers
Jerry Wilson - Tenor Saxophone
James Mack, Rich Tufo - string and horn arrangements

Charts

Singles

References

External links 
 Leroy Hutson-Hutson II album info at Discogs

1976 albums
Leroy Hutson albums
Curtom Records albums